The 2021–22 Basket League was the 10th season of the Basket League, the top professional basketball league in Greece since its establishment in 2012, and the 82nd season of top-flight greek basketball overall.

Teams

Promotion and relegation (pre-season)
Relegated from the 2020-21 Basket League
Messolonghi

Promoted from the 2020-21 A2 League
ApollonOlympiacos

Locations and arenas

Regular season

League table

Results

Playoffs
The eight highest ranked teams in the regular season qualify for the playoffs. Quarterfinals are being played in a "best of 3" format, while the rest of the series are being played in a "best of 5" format.

Bracket

Quarterfinals

|}

Semifinals

|}

Third place series

|}

Finals

|}

Final standings

 *Larisa, despite finishing among the top four teams, did not get the necessary licence to compete to the next years' competition and thus relegrated to the lower category (Greek A2 League)

Awards

MVP
  Sasha Vezenkov – Olympiacos

Finals MVP
  Sasha Vezenkov – Olympiacos

Top Scorer
  Sasha Vezenkov – Olympiacos

Most Popular Player
  Sasha Vezenkov – Olympiacos

Most Improved Player
  Sasha Vezenkov – Olympiacos

Most Spectacular Player
 Stefan Moody – Larisa

Best Defender
 Thomas Walkup – Olympiacos

Best Young Player
 Omiros Netzipoglou – Aris

Best Coach
 Fotis Takianos – Larisa

Clubs in international competitions

See also
2021 Greek Basketball Super Cup
2021–22 Greek Basketball Cup
2021–22 Greek A2 Basket League (2nd tier)

References

External links 
 Official Basket League Site 
 Official Basket League Site 
 Official Hellenic Basketball Federation Site 

Greek Basket League seasons
1
Greek